Tyla Garw is a hamlet within the community of Llanharry in Rhondda Cynon Taf, South Wales, and is located to the west of the Afon Clun, near Pontyclun.

It is also a electoral ward to Llanharry Community Council, electing one of the nine community councillors.

References

Villages in Rhondda Cynon Taf
Wards of Rhondda Cynon Taf